Anton Fig (born 8 August 1952, in Cape Town, South Africa), known as "The Thunder from Down Under", is a South African session drummer, perhaps best known as the drummer and second-in-command for Paul Shaffer and the World's Most Dangerous Band. David Letterman, for whom the band served as house band on his late-night talk shows, often referred to Fig as "Anton Zip" or "Buddy Rich Jr." Fig is also well known for his work with Kiss, Ace Frehley and Joe Bonamassa.

Early career
Fig began playing drums at the age of four. After performing in numerous successful local rock bands in Cape Town, becoming locally respected with bands like Hammak, he moved to Boston to further pursue his musical interests.  His formal education included studies at the New England Conservatory of Music in Boston, where he studied jazz and classical disciplines, and graduated with honors in 1975. In 1976, he moved to New York City, where he began to establish a career as a freelance musician.

Fig was a member of the band Spider during both their album releases in 1980 and 1981 as well as on their 1982 album as newly renamed band Shanghai, together with famed producer Beau Hill and songwriter Holly Knight.

Fig was the drummer on Ace Frehley's 1978 eponymous solo album and subsequently became a member of the then ex-Kiss lead guitarist's solo project Frehley's Comet from 1984 to 1987. Fig also played drums on all but one song on Kiss's 1979 album Dynasty and every song on their 1980 album Unmasked; the use of Fig to replace usual drummer Peter Criss (producers thought Criss, who had a drug problem, had seen a deterioration of his skills) upset Criss, to the point where, after appearing in promotional videos and tours through Unmasked, he left the band. Eric Carr took over drumming duties following Criss's departure.

Other artists with whom he has worked include Bob Dylan, Warren Zevon, B. B. King, Peter Frampton, Joan Armatrading, Cyndi Lauper, Link Wray, John Waite, Robert Gordon, Eric Johnson, Beth Hart, and Kix.

David Letterman
Fig was the drummer for the Paul Shaffer-led house band of David Letterman's late night television shows since 1986, when he debuted with "The World's Most Dangerous Band" on NBC's Late Night with David Letterman. When Letterman's show moved to CBS in 1993 and became Late Show with David Letterman, the band (and Fig) moved as well, adding a horn section and becoming known as the "CBS Orchestra".

During this tenure, Fig and the rest of the band have played with scores of artists including Miles Davis, James Brown, Bruce Springsteen, Steve Winwood, Bonnie Raitt, and Tony Bennett. Fig also played parts in several of the show's comic sketches, including the recurring gag, "Anton Fig's Guess The Expiration Date", in which Fig would be blindfolded and fed a perishable food product and attempt to guess the expiration date on the item solely from tasting it. The CBS Orchestra has also backed up a host of artists in other venues, such as Stevie Wonder, Faith Hill, Little Richard, and also B. B. King at the closing ceremonies of the summer 1996 Olympic Games in Atlanta. They also backed Al Green, Gloria Estefan, 'N Sync, and Eric Clapton for VH1's Save the Music concert at the White House.

The World's Most Dangerous Band is also the house band for the Rock and Roll Hall of Fame. Additionally, they were the backup band for The Concert for New York City where they performed with David Bowie, Mick Jagger and Keith Richards, Eric Clapton and Buddy Guy, Macy Gray, and James Taylor.

On occasions when Paul Shaffer has been absent from The Late Show or has guest-hosted, especially since the death of previous substitute bandleader Warren Zevon in 2003, Fig has filled in as bandleader.

Other projects
Some of the many recordings Fig has made include selections with Bob Dylan, Mick Jagger, Cyndi Lauper, Madonna, Gary Moore, Shanghai, Ace Frehley, Joan Armatrading, Rosanne Cash, Joe Cocker, John Phillips, Warren Zevon, Sebastian Bach, Oz Noy, Jed Davis, Joe Satriani, Paul Butterfield, Link Wray and Chris Spedding. 

He replaced Peter Criss on the Kiss albums Dynasty (1979) and Unmasked (1980), playing drums on all tracks for both albums (except Criss' song from Dynasty, "Dirty Livin'"). Due to Kiss' management attempting to cover up any personnel problems within the band, Fig would not be credited until years later, and Criss appears in the video for "Shandi" off the Unmasked album.

As a freelance drummer, Fig has also played live with Paul Simon, Booker T and the MG's, The Thompson Twins at Live Aid, and Jim Keltner for Bob Dylan's 30th anniversary concert celebration. In 1996, Fig released a drum instructional video and book titled In the Groove and Late Night Drumming, respectively.

In 2002, Fig completed his first solo record, Figments. Produced and co-written by Fig, the record represents three years of work and includes - among others singers and musicians - Richie Havens, Brian Wilson, Ivan Neville, Sebastian Bach, Ace Frehley, Al Kooper, Chris Spedding, Donald "Duck" Dunn, Blondie Chaplin, Paul Shaffer, Chris Botti, Randy Brecker, and Richard Bona. 

In 2006, Fig worked with Blackmore's Night on The Village Lanterne. In 2007, Fig worked with Joe Bonamassa on his Sloe Gin album, in 2009 on his Ballad of John Henry album, and in 2014 on Different Shades of Blue. 

On 4 May 2009, Anton joined Joe Bonamassa's band for their debut appearance at the Royal Albert Hall in London, where Eric Clapton made a guest appearance. A DVD capturing this performance was subsequently released. Fig was featured on Ace Frehley's album Anomaly, released on 15 September 2009.

Discography

With Andy LaVerne
 Severe Clear (SteepleChase, 1990)
 Standard Eyes (SteepleChase, 1990)
With Bob Dylan
 Empire Burlesque (Columbia, 1985)
 Knocked Out Loaded (Columbia, 1986)
With Al Kooper
 Rekooperation (Music Masters, 1994)
 Black Coffee (Favored Nations, 2005)
 White Chocolate (Sony, 2008)
With Beth Hart
 Bang Bang Boom Boom (Provogue, 2012)
With Peter Frampton
 Rise Up (A&M, 1980)
With Kiss
 Dynasty (Casablanca, 1979)
 Unmasked (Casablanca, 1980)
With Rodney Crowell
 Street Language (CBS Records, 1986)
With Europe
 Bag of Bones (Edel, 2012)
With Billy Squier
 Hear & Now (Capitol, 1989)
With Paul Shaffer
 Coast to Coast (Capitol, 1989)
 The World's Most Dangerous Party (SBK, 1993)
With Paul Butterfield
 The Legendary Paul Butterfield Rides Again (Amherst, 1986)
With Beth Hart and Joe Bonamassa
 Don't Explain (J&R, 2011)
 Seesaw (J&R, 2013)
 Black Coffee (J&R, 2018)
With Jennifer Rush
 Heart over Mind (Columbia, 1987)
With Frank Black
 Honeycomb (Black Porch, 2005)
With Martin Briley
 Dangerous Moments (Mercury, 1984)
With Steve Cropper
 Fire It Up (Provogue, 2021)
With Patty Smyth
 Never Enough (Columbia, 1987)
With Rosanne Cash
 Rhythm & Romance (Columbia, 1985)
With Gary Moore
 After Hours (Charisma, 1992)
With Delbert McClinton
 Never Been Rocked Enough (Curb, 1992)
With Cyndi Lauper
 She's So Unusual (Portrait, 1983)
 True Colors (Portrait, 1986)
 Hat Full of Stars (Epic, 1993)
With John Waite
 Rover's Return (EMI, 1987)
With Garland Jeffreys
 American Boy & Girl (A&M, 1979)
With Ace Frehley
 Ace Frehley (Casablanca, 1978)
 Frehley's Comet (Atlantic, 1987)
 Trouble Walkin' (Atlantic, 1989)
 Anomaly (Bronx Born, 2009)
 Spaceman (Entertainment, 2018)
With Madonna
 Erotica (Warner Bros., 1992)
With Joe Satriani
 Engines of Creation (Epic, 2000)
With Mick Jagger
 She's the Boss (Columbia, 1985)
With Warren Zevon
 My Ride's Here (Artemis, 2002)
With The Williams Brothers
 Two Stories (Warner Bros., 1987)
With Joe Bonamassa
 Sloe Gin (J&R, 2007)
 The Ballad of John Henry (J&R, 2009)
 Black Rock (J&R, 2010)
 Dust Bowl (J&R, 2011)
 Driving Towards the Daylight (Provogue, 2012)
 Different Shades of Blue (Provogue, 2014)
 Blues of Desperation (J&R, 2016)
 Redemption (Provogue, 2018)
 Royal Tea (Provogue, 2020)
 Time Clocks (J&R, 2021)
With Karla DeVito
 Is This a Cool World or What? (Epic, 1981)
With Joe Cocker
 Cocker (Capitol, 1986)
With Joan Armatrading
 Me Myself I (A&M, 1980)
With Josh Groban
 Awake (143, 2006)
With The B. Christopher Band
 Surfing With A Vintage Lady (2021)
With Henry Lee Summer
 Henry Lee Summer (Epic, 1988)

References

External links
 
 2014 Audio Interview with Anton Fig from the Podcast "I'd Hit That
 
 Rockin in the USA - Bands Touched by KISS - By Anthony Camponelli - KISSONLINE.COM | Archive

1952 births
Living people
South African expatriates in the United States
Musicians from Cape Town
Musicians from New York City
American rock drummers
South African drummers
Kiss (band) personnel
American session musicians
Late Show with David Letterman
Paul Shaffer and the World's Most Dangerous Band members
Booker T. & the M.G.'s members
20th-century American drummers
American male drummers
The Blues Brothers members
Frehley's Comet members
Alumni of Herzlia High School